Eleni Daniilidou (born 19 September 1982) is a Greek former tennis player from the island of Crete.

She is considered one of the best Greek tennis players of the Open Era, winning five singles titles and three doubles titles on the WTA Tour. In 2003, she reached the mixed-doubles final of the Australian Open, making her the first Greek player to have reached a Grand Slam final. Her highest singles ranking is world No. 14, making her the only female tennis player from Greece to have reached the top 20 until Maria Sakkari in February 2020. No male tennis player had achieved this until Stefanos Tsitsipas reached 15th place in August 2018. By beating Justine Henin in the first round of the 2005 Wimbledon Championships, she became the first player to defeat a reigning French Open champion in the first round of Wimbledon.

Career summary
Daniilidou began her professional career in 1996, making the final of her first ITF event, having barely turned 14. She achieved her first ranking in 1998, finishing that year as the world No. 294. In 2001, she broke into the top 100 following a third round appearance at the US Open.

2002 was the best year of Daniilidou's career, finishing it at No. 22 in the world. She won her first WTA career singles title at the Rosmalen Championships, beating Amélie Mauresmo, Elena Dementieva and Henin; and reached the fourth round of a Grand Slam tournament for the first time at Wimbledon. At the end of the year, she reached her second WTA final at the Brasil Open, beating Monica Seles en route, but lost to Anastasia Myskina.

Daniilidou started 2003 by winning her second WTA title at the Auckland Open and reaching the fourth round of the Australian Open, results which saw her break into the top 20 for the first time, reaching a career high of No. 14 after the German Open. She also reached the semifinals of the Paris Indoors and the DFS Classic.

Daniilidou successfully defended her title at Auckland in 2004, her third WTA singles title. She reached the semifinals at the prestigious Miami Open, beating Jennifer Capriati en route. Later that year she equalled her best Grand Slam performance at the US Open by reaching the fourth round.

2005 was a relatively poor year for Daniilidou, becoming the first since 2001 where she did not win a title. She did, however, cause a huge upset at Wimbledon, beating the reigning French Open champion, Justine Henin. It was the first time the French Open champion had ever lost in the first round of Wimbledon. It also brought the end of Henin's 24-match win streak dating back to the beginning of the clay season. Daniilidou eventually lost in the third round, her best Grand Slam performance of the year. She also reached the semifinals of a lower level WTA event in Portoroz, Slovenia.

She recovered slightly in 2006, going back into the top 50 and winning her fourth WTA singles title at the Korea Open. She also reached the semifinals of the Ordina Open, and remained in the top 50 in 2007 with her best result being a semifinal at the Connecticut Open, where she beat Dinara Safina in the quarterfinals after saving a match point.

2008 was an injury-plagued season for Daniilidou, missing almost half the year with a right knee injury. She won her fifth and last WTA singles title at the Hobart International, but missed several months of events from March. She returned at the Summer Olympics in August, but failed to win a match for the rest of the season, ultimately finishing the year outside the top 100 for the first time since 2000.

Performance timelines
Only main-draw results in WTA Tour, Grand Slam tournaments, Fed Cup and Olympic Games are included in win–loss records.

Singles

Doubles

Grand Slam finals

Mixed doubles: 1 (runner-up)

WTA career finals

Singles: 6 (5 titles, 1 runner–up)

Doubles: 12 (3 titles, 9 runner–ups)

ITF Circuit finals

Singles: 16 (11 titles, 5 runner-ups)

Doubles: 29 (16 titles, 13 runner-ups)

Head-to-head records
 Serena Williams: 0–8
 Venus Williams: 0–2
 Kim Clijsters: 0–2
 Lindsay Davenport: 0–3
 Jelena Jankovic: 0–1
 Nadia Petrova: 1–3
 Dinara Safina: 2–2
 Justine Henin: 2–2
 Maria Sharapova: 0–5

Top-10 wins
Daniilidou has won 7 matches against players who were, at the time the match was played, ranked in the top 10.

Notes

References

External links

 
 
 
 

1982 births
LGBT tennis players
Lesbian sportswomen
Living people
Greek female tennis players
Hopman Cup competitors
Olympic tennis players of Greece
Sportspeople from Chania
Sportspeople from Thessaloniki
Tennis players at the 2000 Summer Olympics
Tennis players at the 2004 Summer Olympics
Tennis players at the 2008 Summer Olympics
Grand Slam (tennis) champions in girls' doubles
Mediterranean Games gold medalists for Greece
Mediterranean Games silver medalists for Greece
Mediterranean Games medalists in tennis
Competitors at the 2001 Mediterranean Games
Greek LGBT sportspeople
Greek lesbians
Australian Open (tennis) junior champions